Daniel McDonald (born December 19, 1973) is an American former professional wrestler and trainer better known under his ring name, Danny Cage.

Professional wrestling career
Cage was a high school wrestler in New Jersey who became interested in training at the Monster Factory at age 12 at a time when his parents were going through a divorce. Cage's father wanted him to go to college but Cage wanted to pursue his dream of becoming a professional wrestler. Cage convinced his father to put money offered to pay for college toward training at the Monster Factory on the condition Cage got into good shape.

Cage had a tryout in 1994 conducted by Larry Sharpe and Glenn Ruth, which Cage passed and was offered the opportunity to train. Cage's father rescinded his offer and Cage would put his dreams on hold until he attended a wrestling card in North Carolina where Joey Matthews and Steve Corino were competing. A friend named Toad advised Cage to return to New Jersey to pursue his dream. In September 1998, Cage began training at the Monster Factory.

Cage competed as a pro wrestler until 2002 before hurting his back, crossing paths with notable Monster Factory alumni Cliff Compton and Sheamus during his stay. Cage would return before retiring from the ring for good in 2005, having his last match with Q.T. Marshall.

Monster Factory
In 2011, Cage took a co-ownership role of the Monster Factory. Cage and Sharpe moved the Monster Factory to its original home town, Paulsboro, before assuming full ownership from Sharpe.

In 2013, Cage added former WWE and ECW wrestler The Blue Meanie and former ECW wrestler Billy Wiles as trainers at the Monster Factory and began to supplement training with seminars with WWE scout Gerald Brisco, former Ring of Honor lead announcer Kevin Kelly, Ohio Valley Wrestling's Rip Rogers, Les Thatcher, as well as wrestlers Montel Vontavious Porter, Colt Cabana, Stevie Richards, "Brutal" Bob Evans, Robbie E, The Powers of Pain, and Sean Waltman. The Monster Factory also conducts birthday parties and ring rentals. In 2014, Marshall was added as an additional trainer while other wrestlers, like Jay Lethal and Waltman began to drop by for informal training sessions.

Cage's method of training has earned him praise from former WWE commentator Kelly, who has said "Monster Factory takes seeds and grows crops in a setting that rivals the (WWE) Performance Center"  and has seen students signed to WWE developmental deals and appear on WWE and Ring of Honor television.

References

Living people
American male professional wrestlers
Professional wrestling trainers
1973 births
Place of birth missing (living people)
People from Cinnaminson Township, New Jersey
People from Palmyra, New Jersey
Professional wrestlers from New Jersey
Sportspeople from Burlington County, New Jersey